Miss Grand Honduras 2022 was the inaugural edition of the Miss Grand Honduras beauty pageant, held at La Galería in Tegucigalpa on July 10, 2022. Eighteen candidates representing 18 departments of Honduras competed for the national title, of whom Saira Cacho Álvarez of Colón Department was named the winner. She then represented the country at the Miss Grand International 2022 pageant held on October 25 in Indonesia, where she was placed among the top 20 finalists, making her the first Honduran representative to obtain the position at Miss Grand International.

In addition to crowning the 2022 representative, Honduran candidates for the Miss Grand International 2023 and Reina Internacional del Cacao 2022 pageants, Britthany Marroquin of Copán and Maryann Espinoza of Atlántida, were respectively determined in the same event.

The event was hosted by José Roberto Padilla, and was highlighted by the live performances of several artists including Moises Aguilar, Kennia Mondragon, Angie Núñez, and Shirley Paz.

Competition
In the grand final competition held on July 10, the results of the preliminary competition— which consisted of the swimsuit and evening gown competition, and the closed-door interview, determined the 10 semifinalists selected at large. The top 10 competed in the question/answer portion and were narrowed down to the top 5, who then delivered a speech related to the pageant campaign, Stop wars and violence. After which Miss Grand Honduras 2022, her two runners-up as well as the other two supplementary titleholders, Miss Grand Honduras 2023 and Reina del Cacao Honduras 2022, were announced.

The summary of the selection process is shown below.

Results summary

Main placements

Special awards

Candidates
18 delegates were qualified to compete for the national title of Miss Grand Honduras 2022.

References

External links 

 
 Miss Grand Honduras official website

Miss Grand Honduras
Grand Honduras